is a railway station in the town of Gōdo, Anpachi District, Gifu Prefecture, Japan, operated by the private railway operator Yōrō Railway.

Lines

Station layout
Kita-Gōdo Station has one ground-level side platform serving  single bi-directional track. The station is unattended.

Adjacent stations

|-
!colspan=5|Yōrō Railway

History
Kita-Gōdo Station opened on March 27, 1986.

Passenger statistics
In fiscal 2015, the station was used by an average of 590 passengers daily (boarding passengers only).

Surrounding area
 Gōdo-chō Kita Elementary School

See also
 List of Railway Stations in Japan

References

External links

 

Railway stations in Gifu Prefecture
Railway stations in Japan opened in 1986
Stations of Yōrō Railway
Gōdo, Gifu